Bedan is a Biblical figure; and it may also refer to:

Type of woodturning chisel with a special wedge-like section used for cutting beads and for hollowing boxes and for use with the sizing tool
Arabic curse word sometimes used to express anger
Nickname of students from the San Beda College in Manila, Philippines
Bedan, Afghanistan, a place in Afghanistan